Turalići is a village in the municipalities of Vlasenica (Republika Srpska) and Kladanj, Bosnia and Herzegovina.

Demographics 
According to the 2013 census, its population was 334.

References

Populated places in Kladanj
Populated places in Vlasenica